Robert F. "Ace" Gruenig (March 12, 1913 – August 11, 1958) was an American basketball player during the 1930s and 1940s.

The 6 ft. 8 in. (203 cm) Gruenig is considered one of the game's first great big men. The Chicago, Illinois native led his high school, Crane Tech, to the Chicago Public High School League championship in 1931. He attended Northwestern University, but withdrew after his freshman year without having played for the varsity. While playing for several AAU teams in the following decade, Gruenig was named AAU All-America 10 times (1937–40, 1942–46, 1948). Furthermore, he led the Denver Safeway (1937), Denver Nuggets (1939) and Denver American Legion (1942) teams to AAU championships. On August 11, 1963, Gruenig was enshrined to the Basketball Hall of Fame.

References
 http://www.apbr.org/aau.html
 https://web.archive.org/web/20110622001342/http://www.hoophall.com/hall-of-famers/tag/robert-f-gruenig

1913 births
1958 deaths
Amateur Athletic Union men's basketball players
American men's basketball players
Basketball players from Denver
Basketball players from Chicago
Centers (basketball)
Denver Nuggets (1948–1950) players
Naismith Memorial Basketball Hall of Fame inductees
Northwestern University alumni
Phillips 66ers players